{{DISPLAYTITLE:C7H13NO2}}
The molecular formula C7H13NO2 (molar mass: 143.19 g/mol) may refer to:

 Dimethylaminoethyl_acrylate
 N-(2-Hydroxypropyl)_methacrylamide

Molecular formulas